Kibingo is a town in Western Uganda. It is the location of the district headquarters of Sheema District.

Location
The coordinates of the town are:0°34'12.0"S, 30°24'54.0"E (Latitude:-0.5700; Longitude:30.4150).

Overview
Kibingo is one of the towns in Sheema District, the others being:

 Kabwohe
 Sheema
 Kamushoko
 Mushanga

Points of interest
The following points of interest lie within the town limits or close to the edges of the town:

 The headquarters of Sheema District Administration
 The offices of Kibingo Town Council
 Kibingo Central Market
 The Mbarara-Bushenyi Highway - The highway passes through the town in an east to west direction.

See also
Sheema District
Ankole sub-region
Western Region, Uganda
Ugandan Towns

References

Sheema District
Ankole sub-region
Populated places in Western Region, Uganda
Cities in the Great Rift Valley